Vladimir Diocese is an eparchy of the Russian Orthodox Church centered in Vladimir Oblast, Russia. The main cathedral of the diocese is the Assumption Cathedral in the Cathedral Square of Vladimir.

As of 1 January 2006, 28 monasteries were in the eparchy (13 male and 15 female), including 13 metochions and sketes, as well as around 300 parishes. The ruling bishop from November 11, 1990 until 2018 was Eulogius (Smirnov), Metropolitan of Vladimir. He died on 22 July 2020.

History 
The Christianization of the Rostov-Suzdal region began, apparently in 990, demonstrated by Christian burials in the region.

In the 1160s, Prince Andrey Bogolyubskii tried to establish an independent metropolitan Vladimir of Kiev led by Theodore (Feodortsem), but the Constantinople Patriarch Luke Chrysoberges rejected his plan. An attempt took place soon after Andrei Bogoliubski brought from the Mezhyhirya Monastery near Kiev the icon of Theotokos of Vladimir in 1155. However the Vladimir diocese was created in 1214 when the Grand Prince of Vladimir George Vsevolodovich separated it from the Rostov diocese (today known as Diocese of Yaroslavl and Rostov). 

Originally the title of bishop was "Suzdal and Vladimir". The first bishop of the newly formed Diocese of Simon was Svyatitel Simon (Simon the Baptist), known as the author of eight stories about the Crypt monks set out in the letters to the Kiev-Pechersk monk Polycarp. They laid the foundation of the Kiev-Pechersk patericon - the first collection of the Lives of Russian saints. Simon died in 1226 and was buried in the Cathedral of the Assumption.

The next bishop was rector of Nativity Vladimir Mitro. The Tatar-Mongol invasion came during the reign of Vladimir. In 1237, the Golden Horde troops of Batu Khan wiped out Ryazan and in February 1238 came close to Vladimir. The city was captured and looted, its residents killed or taken prisoner. Bishop Mitrofan and his family were killed within the walls of the grand Cathedral of the Assumption, which was badly damaged by fire.

Archimandrite was consecrated Bishop of Kiev-Pechersk Monastery Serapion. The bishop received the title of "Vladimir, Suzdal and Nizhny Novgorod". The territory of the diocese then consisted of the Grand Duchy of Vladimir and principalities of Gorodetsky, Kostroma, Moscow, Pereslavsky, Starodubskiy, Suzdal with Nizhny Novgorod and Tartu.

Since 1299, most of the territory of the modern Vladimir diocese was part of the Metropolitan Region (from 1589 - Patriarchal area since 1721 - Synod area) Muromskaya land was under the control of Ryazan bishops. In 1347, on the lands of Suzdal-Nizhny Novgorod principality, Suzdal diocese was formed.

On 16 July 1744, Moscow accepted Vladimir diocese, called Vladimir and Yaropolskoy. From 1786-1788, the Vladimir and Suzdal dioceses merged.

References

Eparchies of the Russian Orthodox Church